Creme Puff (August 3, 1967 – August 6, 2005) was a mixed Tabby domestic cat, owned by Jake Perry of Austin, Texas, US. She was the oldest cat ever recorded, according to the 2010 edition of Guinness World Records, when she died aged 38 years and 3 days.

Perry had another cat, Granpa Rex Allen, who he said was born in Paris, Texas, on 1 February 1964 and died aged 34 years and 59 days on 1 April 1998. The sixth oldest cat ever known, Granpa was posthumously awarded 1999 Cat of the Year by Cats & Kittens magazine. He was featured in an earlier version of the Guinness World Records as the (then) oldest cat ever.

Lifestyle 
Creme Puff's owner, Jake Perry, said her diet consisted of dry cat food supplemented with broccoli, eggs, turkey bacon, coffee with cream, and—every two days—"an eyedropper full of red wine". Perry claimed that this diet was key to her longevity, and that the wine "circulated the arteries".

Perry also kept Creme Puff very active within the home, turning his garage into a movie theater that played nature documentaries for his cats. Wooden steps were built into the walls of Perry's home for the cats to climb on, and Perry had built a screened enclosure in his backyard for his pets, including Creme Puff, to enjoy the outdoors.

See also 
 Aging in cats
 List of oldest cats
 List of individual cats
 Bobi, the longest-lived dog

References

External links 
 South Paws, a documentary about Jake Perry and his cats.



1967 animal births
2005 animal deaths
History of Austin, Texas
Individual cats in the United States
Oldest animals